Matsuo (written: 松尾) is a Japanese surname. Notable people with the name include:

 Akiko Matsuo (松尾 亜紀子, born 1964), Japanese engineer
, Japanese shogi player
, the most famous poet of the Edo period in Japan.
, a Japanese voice actor
, a Japanese video game and anime composer, arranger and orchestrator
, Japanese sport shooter
, a Japanese actress
, a Japanese female marathon runner
, a Foreign Affairs Officer and Navy Admiralty Liaison, Black Dragon Society member, writer, and Japanese Navy strategizer
, the second president of the Dojin-kai
, Japanese engineer
, a Japanese female badminton player
, a Japanese automobile designer
, a Japanese beauty pageant

Matsuo (written: 松夫, 松男) is a masculine Japanese given name. Notable people with the name include:

, a Japanese man charged for a 1952 murder and executed by hanging in 1962
, a Japanese astronomer
, former president of Walt Disney Enterprises of Japan

Japanese-language surnames
Japanese masculine given names